Gutow is a municipality  in the Rostock district, in Mecklenburg-Vorpommern, Germany. It is located several kilometers southwest of the city of Güstrow.

References

External links